Ghunda Karkana is a town and union council in Charsadda District of Khyber-Pakhtunkhwa. It is located at 34°9'45N 71°48'56E and has an altitude of 287 metres (944 feet).

References

Union councils of Charsadda District
Populated places in Charsadda District, Pakistan